Tattooed Teenage Alien Fighters from Beverly Hills (TTAFBH), is an American children's television series produced by DIC Entertainment. It aired on USA Cartoon Express, a kids' block on the USA Network, from 1994 to 1995. Reruns of the show later aired during the Cookie Jar Toons block on This TV from 2011 to 2012. The series is about four teens who are picked by an alien to fight off monsters, while also finding the time to overcome problems at school.

Synopsis
The show was set in Beverly Hills, California. The four central characters of the show were teens selected by a blobby alien named Nimbar to fight off the monsters sent by the evil Emperor Gorganus, who wants to conquer Earth because it is the focal point for a network of "Power Portals" that would facilitate conquest of the galaxy. In the first episode, Nimbar recruits the four high school students and with a touch by his slimy "finger" gives them each a special tattoo based on a constellation in the celestial sphere. When their tattoos flash, this means Nimbar needs them and a portal appears that they can pass through to enter his chamber. Nimbar is the Head Protector of the Power Portals. As such, he served as a Zordon-style mentor.

The teens could then stand atop platforms called "Transo Discs" which teleports them to the scene of the monster attack and transforms them into giant, muscular, Ultraman-style, sleeveless spandex-clad "Galactic Sentinels" who wear American superheroic half-cowl masks with Power Rangers-style metal face plates that cover their nose, mouth and chin. When their acrobatic martial arts skills were not enough, they could put their hands together in an interlocking square and form the ultimate Galactic Sentinel called Knightron.

In one episode, there was a temporary replacement for Laurie when she was injured badly by Predaraptor. He is known as Orion in sentinel mode, his true form. His civilian name was unknown in his duration on Earth. But when Nimbar pronounced his name in an utterance of gurgles, he stated with a sneer, "just call me Rick". He was played by Kevin Castro, who also played Tanker in the related series Superhuman Samurai Syber-Squad.

They frequently could be seen in the Cafe Maison coffee shop at which Drew worked as a waitress and cashier. Drew's aunt, a famous soap opera actress named Nicole Nash, once attempted to purchase the coffee house, but decided against it after running into various issues planning a party there (though the issues were all excuses made by the Sentinels, trying to keep her away from a bomb sent by Gorganus).

One difference between the two shows is that in this show, people noted they were missing. When Drew's aunt confronted her and Drew revealed her secret, she brought her to a psychiatrist to help with her "delusions". It also differed from similar shows in that the heroes were not good friends and in that they sometimes had trouble getting along.

The show also featured at least one episode that made a jab at the "monster of the day" convention by showing how tactically unsound the practice is for conquering a planet. Gorganus went on vacation in that episode and Lechner, Gorganus' unintelligent purple bird pet, tried to conquer Earth in his absence. Lechner's inexperience with the computer systems causes him to send and recall the monster repeatedly, confusing Nimbar to the point of mental regression and nearly winning the day.

The Galactic Sentinels must not reveal their true identity to anyone. In the event that someone happens to follow them through a power portal, they will end up being subjected to the Memory Fader once the monster that Emperor Gorganus sends is defeated.

Characters

Galactic Sentinels

The Galactic Sentinels are champions of Nimbar who can be summoned to him when the tattoos bestowed upon them flash:

 Laurie Foster (portrayed by Leslie Danon) – The leader of the Galactic Sentinels. Smart, sensible, and very organized, she is a cheerleader and the most popular girl in school. As Scorpio the Scorpion (Scorpio performed by Teresa Fahl) she has a shiny skintight light green costume. Her weapon is a slim-bladed sword that, like all Galactic Sentinel weapons, fires energy blasts.
 Gordon Henley (portrayed by Richard Nason) – Although not very likable at first with his preppy-style obsession with money and status, he quickly earns his title. He becomes Taurus the Bull (Taurus performed by John Wilson), donning a gleaming black outfit. He wields a staff as his weapon.
 Drew Vincent (portrayed by Jill Urbach, credited as K. Jill Sorgen) – Drew is the smart tough girl who works at the coffee shop the kids regularly hang out in and wants to be a poet/performance artist. She becomes Centaurus the Centaur (Centaur performed by Teresa Davis), wearing the purple outfit. She uses a combination of a trident/battle axe as her weapon.
 Swinton Sawyer (portrayed by Rugg Williams) – Swinton is the shy, hyperintelligent brains of the group. Unlike the other teens he wears glasses and is African-American. He wears a yellow suit and holds the power of the Roman God Apollo (Apollo performed by William Glenn). His weapon is a small unnamed double-bladed weapon.
 Rick (portrayed by Kevin Castro) – In one episode, Rick is an alien in human form and former warrior for Nimbar. He is cold, distant, and after being the sole survivor of his destroyed planet, he is full of anger toward Nimbar and the other guardians. He holds the power of Orion the Hunter which he uses on the fourth transo disc when Laurie is unable to fight. His name is too complicated for humans to speak so he insists that they and Nimbar call him "Rick". His suit is silver and his fellow Sentinels were Leo the Lion, Draco the Dragon, and Ursa the Great Bear who were badly defeated by Predaraptor.
 Knightron – A powerful giant silver-armored knight who is the combination of any four Galactic Sentinels. In order to form Knightron, the sentinels must put out their tattooed arms to make a square. He is the Ultimate Galactic Sentinel that wields a sword and a shield. However, Knightron's power is "finite" and the Galactic Sentinels are only to form him as a last resort. Knightron never actually speaks in any of the installments and the name of the stuntman who wore the armor was never revealed in the credits. According to the show's fight coordinator Robert Chapin, stunt actors Jim Kratt and Deron McBee alternated wearing the skiff riff armor.

Villains
 Emperor Gorganus (performed by Josh Culp, voiced by Ed Gilbert) – The primary antagonist of the series and ruler of the planet Meleculah. The armor-clad Emperor Gorganus is intent on conquering Earth because it is the focal point for a network of "Power Portals" that would facilitate conquest of the galaxy. He views the battles between his monsters and the Galactic Sentinels through a lens-like device.
 Lechner (voiced by David Lander) – Emperor Gorganus' fat and ugly pet bird. He tends to irritate Gorganus with his often quite sensible questions and grovels expertly when the Emperor threatens him. Gorganus often uses Lechner as his scapegoat for the failure of his plans.

Monsters
These are monstrous mercenaries with various abilities that Emperor Gorganus sends to Earth for various tasks. The Galactic Sentinels fight each on in two known locations, a desert area during sunset and a city during night. Emperor Gorganus can reconstruct his monsters if they are destroyed, modify the monsters' powers, strengthen them, or even transfer the powers of one monster into another. The following monsters have been used:

 Ninjabot (performed by Gary Kasper) – A robotic samurai-style monster. He is armed with a katana that could shoot energy bolts.
 Neuragula – A brain monster, he has two hemispheres: one controlling emotions, the other controlling intelligence. Neuragula's most distinguishing ability would be his ear-piercing screech. He could shoot laser beams, shoot energy prisons, and could mind control his victims.
 The Sorcerer – A metal-masked, black-robed wizard who is one of Emperor Gorganus' most cunning and nefarious monsters. He can use magical attacks and can teleport. He also uses a wand which he turned into a sword a couple of times.
 Voldek (performed by Gary Kasper) – An electrical knight-like monster that could produce static electricity.
 Slaygar – A toxic waste monster.
 Octodroid – An octopus-themed monster, he has the ability to turn freshwater into saltwater, drain the moisture from others, and attack with his tentacles.
 Isolus (performed by Mary Reid) – A four-eyed female ice-elemental monster. Besides her usual ice attacks, she wields a sword and shield with her sword also able to shoot ice beams.
 Culebra – A king cobra-themed monster who can breathe heat.
 Predaraptor – A dinosaur-themed monster that is nearly indestructible. He creates a light above the ridge of his head before he emits a deadly beam.
 Snake Trooper (performed by Terence Rotolo) – A snake-like monster. He can shoot lasers from his hands.

Other characters
 Nimbar (voiced by Glenn Shadix) – A gelatinous glowing blob with high intelligence that calls the teens together, controls and retains their powers and opens portals to and from Earth at will. Nimbar is the Head Protector of the Power Portals and he grants his soldiers tattoos with which to communicate and open portals near simply by swiping an armlike extension over their wrist. He has failed in the past to protect a world from Gorganus and will stop at nothing to insure Earth does not meet the same fate. He is addicted to the Earth delicacy known as chocolate.
 Diane Henley (portrayed by Dani Douthette) – Gordon's mother and the Mayor of Beverly Hills who is usually too busy to spend much time with her son. In "The Ghost Warrior", she temporarily learns that Gordon is Taurus until the Memory Fader is used on her after the Sorcerer's defeat.
 Nicole Nash (portrayed by Janna Lowell) – Drew's aunt who is a movie/soap opera star.
 Roland Sawyer (portrayed by Charles Walker) – Swinton's father, the editor of a local newspaper. In "Mind Games", he planned to transfer Swinton to Billwood Academy until Drew as Swinton asserted himself.
 Sam (portrayed by Jeff Doucette) – the manager of the Coffee House "Cafe Maison". Ironically, Sam is only seen in an episode showcasing alternate realities. In ordinary reality, he's only referred to offscreen.
 Pixel (voiced by Debi Derryberry) – An alien from Hunab Ku that appears in "The Opiate from the Future". Her kind has the ability to predict the future which results in a yes and no outcome and must be in a light source in order to communicate with anyone. Emperor Gorganus had captured Pixel in order to predict his future until Pixel tricked Lechner into letting her out. The Galactic Sentinels rescue her from Slaygar as she tells them to form Knightron. When asked by the Galactic Sentinels if they will be able to defeat Emperor Gorganus, Pixel's predictions come up as yes and no. After Slaygar is defeated, Nimbar uses his technology to portal the rock that Pixel is in back to Hunab Ku.
 Dr. Bradford Clamtin (portrayed by Beans Morocco) – A psychiatrist who appears in the two-part episode "The Psychiatrist". He is called in by Nicole Nash to do some therapy on Drew when it is claimed that Drew has compulsive lying syndrome. Dr. Clamtin does discover the truth about the Galactic Sentinels during their fight with Snake Trooper. At first, the Sentinels are forced to make a deal with him to not take his memory, allowing him to return and examine Nimbar in exchange for pulling an order to have Drew institutionalized. When Snake Trooper is defeated, he says he's going to write a tell-all book. Before he can start his new book about his encounters, Drew subjects him to the Memory Fader, causing Dr. Clamtin to forget what he has seen and being called in by Nicole Nash.

Episodes
 "In the Beginning...." – Emperor Gorganus makes his plans to conquer Earth and sends Ninjabot to attack Earth. Nimbar selects four teens to be his champions and become Galactic Sentinels.
 "The Note" – Drew writes a note to make Gordon think Laurie likes him to prove he just follows rules. Meanwhile, Emperor Gorganus sends Neuragula to Earth.
 "How Time Flies" – Emperor Gorganus sends the Sorcerer to speed up time on Earth which causes some problems for the Galactic Sentinels.
 "Switch" – The Galactic Sentinels accidentally switch genders, changing bodies and lives during their fight with Voldek.
 "Perceptions" – Swinton gets advice from everyone on how to talk to a pretty girl. Meanwhile, Emperor Gorganus sends Slaygar to pollute the Earth.
 "Three Cheats to the Wind" – Drew works on her essay of Les Misérables. Meanwhile, Emperor Gorganus sends Octodroid to change the Earth's freshwater into saltwater.
 "The Quitter" – Neuragala uses his powers to turn Laurie into a selfish brat, causing her to quit the Galactic Sentinels and leaving the others powerless to stop Neuragula.
 "Commitments" – Drew and Gordon pose as a couple when they use the bracelet belonging to Gordon's mom to save the world.
 "Mind Games" – The Galactic Sentinels bring the Sorcerer's wand which causes Nimbar to act strangely and causes him to disband the Galactic Sentinels. Meanwhile, Swinton tells the others that his parents plan on transferring him to the Billwood Academy.
 "The Spy" – Emperor Gorganus sends Isolus to Earth disguised as a foreign exchange student named Ilse Lang.
 "The Brain Drain" – Gorganus sends Neuragula to drain the minds of the people on Earth.
 "A Nightmare on Rodeo Drive" – Emperor Gorganus sends the Sorcerer to bring the nightmares of the Galactic Sentinels to life.
 "The Rat" – Gordon ends up having his mind transmodified into Swinton's mouse Darwin upon going through the Power Portal with him at the same time. Meanwhile, Emperor Gorganus sends Culebra to raise Earth's temperature.
 "The Cover-Up" – Emperor Gorganus sends Octodroid to capture a Galactic Sentinel. He manages to successfully capture Swinton and now the others have to find a way to rescue him while trying to cover-up where Swinton is to his father.
 "Bully For You" – An attempt to restore Swinton's confidence by disguising Gordon as Culebra backfires when the real Culebrea appears and almost destroys the Galactic Sentinels.
 "Trust" – Laurie, Gordon, and Swinton read from Drew's diary when it comes to her family life. Meanwhile, Emperor Gorganus sends Voldek to knock out Earth's electrical grid.
 "The Y Files" – Two government agents arrive in Beverly Hills and consider it as Ground Zero for all extraterrestrial sightings. Meanwhile, Emperor Gorganus sends Isolus to Earth's desert in order to plunge the Earth into the next Ice Age.
 "The Chocolate War" – Thanks to Emperor Gorganus and Culebra, a friendly competition gets out of hand and threatens the ability of the Galactic Sentinels to form Knighttron.
 "The Monster Among Us" – Gordon misses out on the date of a lifetime as Emperor Gorganus and Octodroid replaces Taurus with a look-alike android.
 "The Universal Hitchhiker" – Drew learns a lesson in believing in others when she redeems a fallen Sentinel called Orion that ends up saving the Galactic Sentinels from Predaraptor.
 "Deja Vu" – The Galactic Sentinels have to live a party life over and over until they get it right and destroy Neuragula who has trapped them in a time loop.
 "The Ghost Warrior" – Emperor Gorganus sends the Sorcerer to Earth disguised as Taurus in order to make a public appearance in a plot to lure out the Galactic Sentinels.
 "The Opiate from the Future" – Emperor Gorganus sends Slaygar to capture Pixel, an alien from Hunab Ku whose kind can predict the future. When the Galactic Sentinels rescue Pixel, the Galactic Sentinels hope to use Pixel in their advantage during their fight against Emperor Gorganus.
 "The Leech" – The Sorcerer places a Mind Leech onto Drew in order to find out the identities of the Galactic Sentinels. The Mind Leech ends up causing a personality change in Drew.
 "Gordon Cries Wolf" – Gordon's white lie gets him in trouble when he ends up involving Laurie when he overhears that a student named Brad is going to ask her out and then diss her. Meanwhile, Emperor Gorganus sends an upgraded Isolus to destroy the Galactic Sentinels.
 "Penny for Your Thoughts" – Laurie believes she has the ability to read minds as a Residual Effect from portaling. But what she hears is not nice and is on the verge of tearing the team apart when they discover the false thoughts were planted by Neuragula.
 "Turncoat" – Given an opportunity by Ninjabot to save Earth forever from Emperor Gorganus, the Galactic Sentinels learn they cannot pass along their problems to somebody else.
 "Mr. Popularity" – After being hit by Wish Dust emitted from Predaraptor's tail, Swinton discovers he should be careful what he wishes that might come true, especially if Emperor Gorganus can use it to destroy the Galactic Sentinels.
 "Winner Takes All" – The teens decide to be friends, only to learn friendship has its pitfalls, when Earth is at stake when Emperor Gorganus sends Ninjabot to challenge the Galactic Sentinels.
 "Beverly Hills 902-Oblivion" – The Galactic Sentinels must defend the homefront when it is discovered a Bal Darian Portal Torpedo has been portaled back to the Coffeehouse with them following their fight with Predaraptor.
 "Ozone O-Mio" – Emperor Gorganus sends Slaygar to suck up the Earth's ozone layer while Gordon is busy sucking up to Swinton's father.
 "The Glitch" – While fighting Voldek, the Power Portal develops a malfunction which sends the Galactic Sentinels to some very strange parallel universes where Zsa Zsa Gabor is the Mayor of Beverly Hills.
 "Emperor for a Day" – Swinton tries to take a test that would get him into college. Meanwhile, Emperor Gorganus goes on vacation and Lechner watches over the palace while Emperor Gorganus is away. Lechner almost succeeds in driving Nimbar to the breaking point with Culebra's appearing and disappearing from Earth.
 "The Impostor" – Aunt Nicole's soap opera "Storm and Stress" bases a new character on Drew, and Laurie lands the role. Laurie begins to emulate Drew in an attempt to "get in character". Drew's resentment at this threatens to destroy the Sentinels' team unity when Emperor Gorganus sends Voldek to Earth.
 "Take Two Galactic Sentinels and Call Nimbar in the Morning" – The common cold almost causes the destruction of the Earth when it sweeps through the ranks of the Galactic Sentinels, ultimately afflicting even Nimbar. Meanwhile, Emperor Gorganus sends Isolus to reverse Earth's temperatures.
 "The Last People on Earth" – Gordon tries to find the guy who ripped him off with the fake CD Player. Meanwhile, Emperor Gorganus gives Voldek a Lifeform Compressor in order to collect the people of Earth.
 "The Primal Scream" – Emperor Gorganus attempts to activate a Portal Jammer which will defeat Nimbar. Drew, Swinton and Gordon race the clock to reverse a galactic virus which is de-evolving Laurie into a deranged monster while fighting Slaygar at the same time.
 "The Psychiatrist" Pt. 1 – The Galactic Sentinels face discovery, when Drew has to meet a psychiatrist named Dr. Bradford Clamtin who wants to institutionalize her! Meanwhile, Emperor Gorganus installs a memory-enhancing chip into Snake Trooper so that he can anticipate the Galactic Sentinels' every move.
 "The Psychiatrist" Pt. 2 – Dr. Bradford Clamtin discovers the truth about the Galactic Sentinels as Snake Trooper begins his next attack.
 "It's a Gorganus Life" – On Christmas, Drew is eager to see It's a Wonderful Life and Nimbar plans to teach the Galactic Sentinels a lesson by placing them in a hologram to show what would happen if Emperor Gorganus had conquered Earth. Emperor Gorganus takes the opportunity to reprogram the hologram so that he can have an advantage when he fights the Galactic Sentinels himself.

Broadcast
From 2011 to 2012, reruns of Tattooed Teenage Alien Fighters aired during the Cookie Jar Toons block on This TV. Its time slot was at 9:00 AM, right before Liberty's Kids.

Home media
In October 2013, Mill Creek Entertainment (under license from DHX Media) released the complete series on DVD in Region 1.

Critical reception
A Syfy Wire video positively reviewed the show's "campy" tone, saying, "The name's so ridiculous it's funny, just like the show. This show was like The Room of Power Rangers copycats - which I say as a compliment, because I love The Room." Comic Book Resources said "The show's writing was comparable to Mighty Morphin Power Rangers and occasionally exceeded it on certain levels. The series gave a well-rounded view into the protagonists' backgrounds and revealed their shortcomings and personal conflicts. However, while the series added depth to the action-packed scenes, its low budget restricted its place in the genre."

References

External links
 Tattooed Teenage Alien Fighters from Beverly Hills at DHX Media Ltd.
 Tattooed Teenage Alien Fighters from Beverly Hills on the Cookie Jar website
 

1990s American science fiction television series
1994 American television series debuts
1995 American television series endings
American action television series
American adventure television series
American fantasy television series
American science fiction television series
American superhero television series
American television shows featuring puppetry
English-language television shows
Martial arts television series
Teen superhero television series
Television series about teenagers
Television series by DIC Entertainment
USA Network original programming